Harald Feuchtmann Pérez (born 22 December 1987) is a Chilean handball player for DJK Waldbüttelbrunn and the Chilean national team.

He participated at the 2017 World Men's Handball Championship.

He is the brother of Emil and Erwin who are both handball players themselves.

References

1987 births
Living people
People from Punta Arenas
Chilean male handball players
Chilean people of German descent
Expatriate handball players
Chilean expatriates in Germany
Handball players at the 2011 Pan American Games
Pan American Games bronze medalists for Chile
Pan American Games medalists in handball
Medalists at the 2011 Pan American Games
21st-century Chilean people
20th-century Chilean people